The Mortal Storm is a 1940 American drama film produced by Metro-Goldwyn-Mayer. It was directed by Frank Borzage and stars Margaret Sullavan and James Stewart. The film shows the impact on Germans after Hitler becomes chancellor of Germany and gains unlimited power. The supporting cast features Robert Young, Robert Stack, Frank Morgan, Dan Dailey, Ward Bond and Maria Ouspenskaya.

Plot
In the mountains of Germany near the Austrian border on January 30, 1933, Professor Viktor Roth, a distinguished "non-Aryan" professor who is adored by his students, celebrates his 60th birthday. His family consists of his wife Amelie, his daughter Freya, his young son Rudi and his adult stepsons Erich and Otto von Rohn. His class greets him with applause and a trophy presented by Martin Breitne and Fritz Marberg. The professor is proud of his family's "tolerance and sense of humor."

Suddenly, everything changes. The maid brings wonderful news: Adolf Hitler has become chancellor of Germany. Listening to the radio. Amelie worries about what will happen to free thinkers and non-Aryans. The ecstatic young men leave for a meeting, but Martin demurs.

Martin, Fritz and Freya meet at an inn, where Professor Werner is bullied by a gang for not singing along with a patriotic song. Martin interferes and the bullies allow Werner to leave. Fritz delivers Martin an ultimatum: join the party or be wiped out with other "pacifist vermin," but Martin refuses. Outside, the gang is beating Werner. On the train ride home, Fritz criticizes Freya for behavior unbecoming the daughter of a "non-Aryan."

Professor Roth refuses to teach the doctrine of racial purity, and his classes are boycotted. Students, who are now all in uniform, rally to burn banned books.

When Martin brings Freya home, the waiting gang assaults him. Mrs. Roth intervenes, admonishing her sons, who move out of their home. Weeks later, Freya comes to Martin's mountain farm. She wants him to meet their friends at the inn. He confesses his love to her. Professor Werner appears, begging for help because he is soon to be arrested. That night, Martin takes him on skis through a secret pass to Austria while the women successfully resist police attempts to intimidate them.

Professor Roth is arrested and Freya begs Fritz to learn where the professor has been taken. Fritz reluctantly arranges a brief meeting between Viktor and his wife at the concentration camp where he is imprisoned. Viktor urges her to leave the country with Freya and Rudi.

Otto comes home with news that the professor has died, supposedly from a heart attack, but Freya believes that he was killed.

At the border, Freya is detained for carrying her father's unpublished manuscript. Martin's mother writes to tell her that he is waiting at the farm to take her to Austria. They drink from the bride cup, with Hilda's blessing. Elsewhere, the Nazis beat Elsa until she reveals the pass. A Gestapo officer testing Fritz's loyalty makes him leader of the ski patrol. Fritz orders them to fire. Freya dies in Martin's arms in Austria.

In the Roths' home, Fritz tells Erich and Otto of Freya's death and flees, crying "It was my duty!" Erich is furious that Martin is free and storms out of the house. Before Otto leaves, he recalls in his mind some conversations that had taken place there -- some, words by his father. Over celestial music, a man speaks: "I said to a man who stood at a gate, give me a light that I may tread safely into the unknown. And he replied, go out into the darkness and put your hand into the hand of God. That shall be to you better than a light, and safer than a known way."

Cast
 Margaret Sullavan as Freya Roth
 James Stewart as Martin Breitner
 Robert Young as Fritz Marberg
 Frank Morgan as Prof. Viktor Roth
 Robert Stack as Otto von Rohn
 Bonita Granville as Elsa
 Irene Rich as Amelie Roth
 William T. Orr as Erich von Rohn
 Maria Ouspenskaya as Hilda Breitner
 Gene Reynolds as Rudi Roth
 Ward Bond as Franz
 Russell Hicks as Rector of University
 William Edmunds as Lehman, University Doorman
 Esther Dale as Marta, the Roths' Maid
 Dan Dailey as Hal or Holl, Youth Party Leader (billed as Dan Dailey, Jr.)
 Granville Bates as Prof. Berg

Production
The film is based on the 1937 novel The Mortal Storm by the British writer Phyllis Bottome, who had moved to Austria in 1924 when her husband Alban Ernan Forbes Dennis was posted there. Dennis was a British diplomat and a MI6 station head with responsibility for Austria, Hungary and Yugoslavia. In 1930, she moved to Munich. She witnessed the rise of fascism, the rise to power of the Nazi party and the transformation of Nazi Germany.

The film's script diverged considerably from the story told in the book, but Bottome felt that the film retained the book's essence. However, Bottome wrote: "What it is to be a Nazi has been shown with unequivocal sincerity and life-likeness, but in the scene between the Jewish professor and his son, Rudi, there was a watering down of courage. Those familiar with the father’s definition of a good Jew will miss its full significance in the film because the central idea has been overlaid by insignificant words."

The Mortal Storm was one of the few directly anti-Nazi Hollywood films released before the American entry into World War II in December 1941. The Freya Roth character is the daughter of a Junker mother and a "non-Aryan" father. It is implied that Freya, her father and Rudi are Jews, but the word "Jew" is never actually used, and they are identified as "non-Aryans." Erich and Otto von Rohn are not "non-Aryan", but they must fear guilt by association. The film infuriated the Nazi government; as a result, all MGM films were subsequently banned in Germany.

Mountain snow scenes were filmed in Salt Lake City, Utah and Sun Valley, Idaho.

The score by award-winning composer Bronislau Kaper and by Eugene Zador was credited to the pseudonym of Edward Kane.

The film concludes with an excerpt from the poem "The Gate of the Year", which King George VI made famous when he quoted it during his Christmas 1939 radio broadcast.

The Mortal Storm was the last film in which Margaret Sullavan and James Stewart appeared together.

Reception
Bosley Crowther of The New York Times called The Mortal Storm "magnificently directed and acted ... a passionate drama, struck out of the deepest tragedy, which is comforting at this time only in its exposition of heroic stoicism." Howard Barnes' review in the New York Herald Tribune lamented that Europe was at war by the time of the film's release: "Less than a year ago, it would have had far more dramatic and emotional impact than it has at this time. ... It is not MGM's fault, but the timing on the making of The Mortal Storm has been extremely bad."

A review in Variety stated: "It is not the first of the anti-Nazi pictures, but it is the most effective film exposé to date of the totalitarian idea, a slugging indictment of the political and social theories advanced by Hitler. ... Performances are excellent." Harrison's Reports wrote: "This is the most powerful anti-Nazi picture yet produced. It excels in every department - that of acting, direction, production and photography." Film Daily wrote: "Because of its virulent exposition of Nazi methods, this film must be seen by every American ... Magnificently directed by Frank Borzage, pulsating with dramatic power, and played up to the hilt by a transcendingly skillful cast, it will electrify audiences wherever it is shown." John Mosher of The New Yorker praised the film's story for being presented "without any theatrical nonsense" and added, "What is outstanding about Frank Borzage's direction is its restraint. The cruel story is told without any of the highlights of horror. We feel that what lies behind is worse than what we are shown."

The Mortal Storm ranked tenth on Film Daily's year-end nationwide poll of 546 critics naming the best films of 1940.

The film holds a 100% fresh rating on Rotten Tomatoes based on 11 reviews.

See also
 List of films with a 100% rating on Rotten Tomatoes, a film review aggregator website

References

External links

 
 
 
 

1940 films
1940 drama films
American black-and-white films
American drama films
American World War II propaganda films
Articles containing video clips
Films about Nazi Germany
Films based on British novels
Films directed by Frank Borzage
Films produced by Frank Borzage
Films produced by Victor Saville
Films scored by Bronisław Kaper
Films set in 1933
Films set in Germany
Films shot in Utah
Metro-Goldwyn-Mayer films
American skiing films
1940s English-language films